The women's 10,000 metres event at the 2014 Asian Games was held at the Incheon Asiad Main Stadium, Incheon, South Korea on 27 September.

Schedule
All times are Korea Standard Time (UTC+09:00)

Records

Results
Legend
DNF — Did not finish
DNS — Did not start

References

Results

10,000 metres women
2014 women